Teucrium flavum is a species of shrub in the family Lamiaceae. They have a self-supporting growth form and simple, broad leaves. Individuals can grow to 0.39 m.

Sources

References 

flavum
Flora of Malta